Tomoxia is a genus of beetles in the family Mordellidae, containing the following species:

 Tomoxia abrupta Ray, 1944
 Tomoxia albonotata Maeklin, 1875
 Tomoxia alboscutella Ermisch, 1955
 Tomoxia albosuturalis Pic, 1924
 Tomoxia anotata Ray, 1949
 Tomoxia antipodes Ray, 1930
 Tomoxia auratonotata Ray, 1936
 Tomoxia binotata Ray, 1939
 Tomoxia borealis (LeConte, 1862)
 Tomoxia brevipennis Ray, 1939
 Tomoxia bucephala (Costa, 1854)
 Tomoxia carinata Smith, 1883
 Tomoxia contracta Champion, 1891
 Tomoxia diversimaculata Ray, 1930
 Tomoxia exoleta Lea, 1917
 Tomoxia fascifera (LeConte, 1878)
 Tomoxia fiebrigi Ray, 1939
 Tomoxia flavicans Waterhouse, 1878
 Tomoxia formosana Chûjô, 1935
 Tomoxia howensis Lea, 1917
 Tomoxia inclusa LeConte, 1862
 Tomoxia innotata Píc, 1924
 Tomoxia intermedia Ray, 1930
 Tomoxia interrupta Champion, 1891
 Tomoxia inundata Wickham, 1914
 Tomoxia latenotata Píc, 1924
 Tomoxia laticeps Lea, 1895
 Tomoxia laticollis Píc, 1936
 Tomoxia latipalpis Ray, 1946
 Tomoxia lineaticollis Píc, 1933
 Tomoxia lineella LeConte, 1862
 Tomoxia maculicollis Lea, 1902
 Tomoxia melanura Lea, 1917
 Tomoxia melasoma Lea, 1917
 Tomoxia multilineata Pic, 1936
 Tomoxia muriniceps Sharp, 1883
 Tomoxia obliquialba Lea, 1925
 Tomoxia paulonotata Pic, 1936
 Tomoxia philippinensis Ray, 1930
 Tomoxia picicolo Ermisch, 1949
 Tomoxia psotai Ray, 1936
 Tomoxia relicta Takakuwa, 1985
 Tomoxia ryukyuana Takakuwa, 1985
 Tomoxia serricornis Ray, 1939
 Tomoxia serval (Say, 1835)
 Tomoxia sexlineata Lea, 1895
 Tomoxia similaris Nomura, 1967
 Tomoxia spinifer Champion, 1891
 Tomoxia suboblongifera Lea, 1931
 Tomoxia subsuturalis Píc, 1936
 Tomoxia undulata (Melsheimer, 1846)
 Tomoxia xenicornis Ray, 1944

References

 
Mordellinae
Taxa named by Achille Costa